Gianantonio Da Re (born 6 September 1953 in Cappella Maggiore) is an Italian politician who was elected as a member of the European Parliament in 2019. He has been Mayor of Vittorio Veneto.

References

Living people
1953 births
Mayors of places in Veneto
MEPs for Italy 2019–2024
Lega Nord MEPs
Lega Nord politicians